Philip James Huggins  (born 16 October 1948) is a bishop in the Anglican Church of Australia.  He was the ninth Bishop of Grafton.

Huggins was educated at Monash University and  ordained in 1977. He began his ordained ministry in the Diocese of Bendigo.  After this he was an industrial chaplain in the Diocese of Melbourne and a chaplain at Monash University. In 1988 he was the unsuccessful Labor candidate for the Victorian Legislative Assembly seat of Berwick. From 1991, he was the Vicar of Williamstown, and from 1994, the Archdeacon of Essendon. He was a regional bishop in the Diocese of Perth from 1995 to 1998; the diocesan Bishop of Grafton from 1998 to 2003; and has been a regional bishop in the Diocese of Melbourne since 2004. He is married to Elizabeth Cuming.

He became the secretary of the Australian chapter of the Anglican Pacifist Fellowship after the retirement of the Very Reverend David Thawley.

References

1948 births
Monash University alumni
Anglican archdeacons in Australia
Assistant bishops in the Anglican Diocese of Melbourne
Anglican bishops of Grafton
20th-century Anglican bishops in Australia
21st-century Anglican bishops in Australia
Living people
Anglican pacifists